Proteroiulus is a genus of millipedes in the family Blaniulidae, containing the following species:
Proteroiulus broelemanni Lohmander, 1925
Proteroiulus fuscus (Am Stein, 1857)
Proteroiulus hispanus Schubart, 1959

References

Julida
Taxa named by Filippo Silvestri